Robert Washington Shirley, 13th Earl Ferrers,  (8 June 1929 – 13 November 2012), styled Viscount Tamworth between 1937 and 1954, was a British Conservative politician and member of the House of Lords as one of the remaining hereditary peers. He was one of the few people to serve in the governments of five prime ministers.

Background and education
Lord Ferrers was the eldest child and only son of Robert Shirley, 12th Earl Ferrers. Educated at the West Downs School, Winchester College and Magdalene College, Cambridge, he succeeded to become 13th Earl Ferrers in 1954 on the death of his father. He took his seat in the House of Lords on 2 February 1955.

He received an emergency commission as a second lieutenant in the Coldstream Guards on 27 November 1948, serving in Malaya. His commission was regularized on 4 March 1950, with seniority from 1 January 1949. Tamworth was promoted to lieutenant on 3 August 1950.

Political career
An early contribution in parliament in 1957 was against the admission of women:

In the event, a small number of women came into the Lords as a result of the Life Peerages Act 1958. Women who held hereditary peerages in their own right were admitted by the Peerage Act 1963.

Ferrers served as a Lord-in-waiting (government whip) from 1962 until 1964 under both Harold Macmillan and Sir Alec Douglas-Home. When the Conservatives were returned to power under Edward Heath, he once again served as a Lord-in-Waiting from 1971 to 1974, then serving as a Parliamentary Secretary at the Ministry of Agriculture, Fisheries and Food (MAFF) at the beginning of 1974.

When the Conservatives were returned to power under Margaret Thatcher in 1979, Lord Ferrers returned to MAFF, this time as a Minister of State. He left office in 1983, and returned to the backbenches in the Lords. In 1988 he returned to government service as a Minister of State at the Home Office, and in 1994 moved to the Department of Trade and Industry, where he remained until 1995, when he became Minister for the Environment at the Department of the Environment. Between 1979 and 1983, and again between 1988 and 1997, he served as Deputy Leader of the House of Lords.

With the passage of the House of Lords Act 1999, Ferrers along with almost all other hereditary peers lost his automatic right to sit in the House of Lords. He was, however, elected as one of the 92 elected hereditary peers to remain in the House of Lords pending completion of House of Lords reform, coming first in the ballot.

He was made a Privy Counsellor in 1982. Earl Ferrers was a Vice-President of the Royal Stuart Society and Grand Prior of the Grand Bailiwick & Priory of England and Wales of the Military and Hospitaller Order of Saint Lazarus of Jerusalem. He was also High Steward of Norwich Cathedral from 1979-2007 and a Deputy Lieutenant of the County of Norfolk from 1983. He was moved to the retired list in 2004 upon reaching the Mandatory retirement age of 75.

Earl Ferrers was Deputy Leader of the House of Lords from 1979 to 1983 and from 1988 to 1997, and Minister of State in four different departments: at Agriculture, Food and Fisheries from 1979 to 1983; at the Home Office from 1988 to 1994; at the Department of Trade and Industry (in charge of small firms and consumer affairs) from 1994 to 1995; and at the Department of the Environment (responsible for environment and the countryside) from 1995 to 1997

Family
The Earl married Annabel Carr (1930–2019) in 1951. The couple had five children:
 Robert William Saswalo Shirley, 14th Earl Ferrers (b. 29 Dec 1952), a chartered accountant;
 Lady Angela Mary Shirley  (b. 16 June 1954);
 Lady Sallyanne Margaret Shirley  (22 March 1957 – 6 July 2011);
 Lady Selina Clare Shirley  (1 July 1958 – 2 June 1998), in whose memory the Royal Academy's Selina Chenevière Travel Award was founded;
 Hon. Andrew John Carr Sewallis Shirley (b. 24 June 1965).

The family country seat is Ditchingham Hall near the village of Ditchingham, south Norfolk.

References

Ministerial posts

External links

1929 births
2012 deaths
Alumni of Magdalene College, Cambridge
Coldstream Guards officers
Conservative Party (UK) Baronesses- and Lords-in-Waiting
Deputy Lieutenants of Norfolk
Earls Ferrers
Members of the Privy Council of the United Kingdom
Ministers in the Macmillan and Douglas-Home governments, 1957–1964
People educated at West Downs School
People educated at Winchester College
People from Ditchingham
Recipients of the Order of Saint Lazarus (statuted 1910)
Hereditary peers elected under the House of Lords Act 1999